Raja Sagheer Ahmed is a Pakistani politician who had been a member of the Provincial Assembly of the Punjab from August 2018 till January 2023.

Early life
He was born on 1 January 1956 in Pakistan.

Political career

He was elected to the Provincial Assembly of the Punjab as an independent candidate from Constituency PP-7 (Rawalpindi-II) in 2018 Pakistani general election. He received 44,363 votes and defeated Raja Muhammad Ali, a candidate of Pakistan Muslim League Nawaz (PML-N). Following his successful election, he joined Pakistan Tehreek-e-Insaf (PTI).

References

Living people
Punjab MPAs 2018–2023
Pakistan Tehreek-e-Insaf MPAs (Punjab)
1956 births